Lombardy elected its fifth delegation to the Italian Senate on May 19, 1968. This election was a part of national Italian general election of 1968 even if, according to the Italian Constitution, every senatorial challenge in each Region is a single and independent race.

The election was won by the centrist Christian Democracy, as it happened at national level. Seven Lombard provinces gave a majority or at least a plurality to the winning party, while the agricultural Province of Pavia and Province of Mantua preferred the Italian Communist Party.

Background
Following the alliance between Christian Democracy and the Italian Socialist Party (PSI), which entered into Aldo Moro's centre-left governments, the PSI created a federation with another member of the coalition, the Italian Democratic Socialist Party, but it paid its toll to the Italian Communist Party, which joined its forces with the newly established Italian Socialist Party of Proletarian Unity, the former Socialist leftist wing.

Electoral system
The electoral system for the Senate was a strange hybrid which established a form of proportional representation into FPTP-like constituencies. A candidate needed a landslide victory of more than 65% of votes to obtain a direct mandate. All constituencies where this result was not reached entered into an at-large calculation based upon the D'Hondt method to distribute the seats between the parties, and candidates with the best percentages of suffrages inside their party list were elected.

Results

|-
|- bgcolor="#E9E9E9"
!rowspan="1" align="left" valign="top"|Party
!rowspan="1" align="center" valign="top"|votes
!rowspan="1" align="center" valign="top"|votes (%)
!rowspan="1" align="center" valign="top"|seats
!rowspan="1" align="center" valign="top"|swing
|-
!align="left" valign="top"|Christian Democracy
|valign="top"|1,984,071
|valign="top"|42.2
|valign="top"|20
|valign="top"|1
|-
!align="left" valign="top"|Italian Communist Party & PSIUP
|valign="top"|1,238,087
|valign="top"|26.3
|valign="top"|12
|valign="top"|2
|-
!align="left" valign="top"|PSI & PSDI
|valign="top"|836,918
|valign="top"|17.8
|valign="top"|8
|valign="top"|3
|-
!align="left" valign="top"|Italian Liberal Party
|valign="top"|397,273
|valign="top"|8.4
|valign="top"|4
|valign="top"|=
|-
!align="left" valign="top"|Italian Social Movement
|valign="top"|177,956
|valign="top"|3.8
|valign="top"|1
|valign="top"|=
|-
!align="left" valign="top"|Others
|valign="top"|70,545
|valign="top"|1.5
|valign="top"|-
|valign="top"|=
|- bgcolor="#E9E9E9"
!rowspan="1" align="left" valign="top"|Total parties
!rowspan="1" align="right" valign="top"|4,704,850
!rowspan="1" align="right" valign="top"|100.0
!rowspan="1" align="right" valign="top"|45
!rowspan="1" align="right" valign="top"| -
|}

Sources: Italian Ministry of the Interior

Constituencies

|-
|- bgcolor="#E9E9E9"
!align="left" valign="top"|N°
!align="center" valign="top"|Constituency
!align="center" valign="top"|Elected
!align="center" valign="top"|Party
!align="center" valign="top"|Votes %
!align="center" valign="top"|Others
|-
|align="left"|1
|align="left"|Bergamo
|align="left"|Giovanni Zonca
|align="left"|Christian Democracy
|align="left"|58.1%
|align="left"|
|-
|align="left"|2
|align="left"|Clusone
|align="left"|Giuseppe Belotti
|align="left"|Christian Democracy
|align="left"|66.3%
|align="left"|
|-
|align="left"|3
|align="left"|Treviglio
|align="left"|Aurelio Colleoni
|align="left"|Christian Democracy
|align="left"|62.1%
|align="left"|
|-
|align="left"|4
|align="left"|Brescia
|align="left"|Annibale FadaDolores Abbiati
|align="left"|Christian DemocracyItalian Communist Party
|align="left"|44.6%25.4%
|align="left"|
|-
|align="left"|5
|align="left"|Breno
|align="left"|Giacomo Mazzoli
|align="left"|Christian Democracy
|align="left"|58.1%
|align="left"|
|-
|align="left"|6
|align="left"|Chiari
|align="left"|Faustino Zugno
|align="left"|Christian Democracy
|align="left"|57.9%
|align="left"|
|-
|align="left"|7
|align="left"|Salò
|align="left"|Fabiano De Zan
|align="left"|Christian Democracy
|align="left"|48.8%
|align="left"|
|-
|align="left"|8
|align="left"|Como
|align="left"|Pasquale Valsecchi
|align="left"|Christian Democracy
|align="left"|44.0%
|align="left"|
|-
|align="left"|9
|align="left"|Lecco
|align="left"|Tommaso Morlino
|align="left"|Christian Democracy
|align="left"|54.3%
|align="left"|
|-
|align="left"|10
|align="left"|Cantù
|align="left"|Mario Martinelli
|align="left"|Christian Democracy
|align="left"|53.9%
|align="left"|
|-
|align="left"|11
|align="left"|Cremona
|align="left"|Giovanni LombardiArnaldo Bera
|align="left"|Christian DemocracyItalian Communist Party
|align="left"|40.1%34.4%
|align="left"|
|-
|align="left"|12
|align="left"|Crema
|align="left"|Ennio Zelioli
|align="left"|Christian Democracy
|align="left"|52.4%
|align="left"|
|-
|align="left"|13
|align="left"|Mantua
|align="left"|Tullia Romagnoli
|align="left"|Italian Communist Party (Gsi)
|align="left"|34.3%
|align="left"|Leonello Zenti (DC) 35.6%Elena Gatti (PSU) 19.4%
|-
|align="left"|14
|align="left"|Ostiglia
|align="left"|Teodosio AimoniGastone Darè
|align="left"|Italian Communist PartyItalian Socialist Party (PSDI)
|align="left"|41.2%21.0%
|align="left"|
|-
|align="left"|15
|align="left"|Milan 1
|align="left"|Giorgio Bergamasco
|align="left"|Italian Liberal Party
|align="left"|25.7% 
|align="left"|
|-
|align="left"|16
|align="left"|Milan 2
|align="left"|Francantonio BiaggiGastone Nencioni
|align="left"|Italian Liberal PartyItalian Social Movement
|align="left"|22.6%7.7%
|align="left"|
|-
|align="left"|17
|align="left"|Milan 3
|align="left"|Italo ViglianesiArturo Robba
|align="left"|Italian Socialist PartyItalian Liberal Party
|align="left"|21.4%18.6%
|align="left"|
|-
|align="left"|18
|align="left"|Milan 4
|align="left"|Vincenzo PalumboAlessandro Morino
|align="left"|Italian Liberal PartyItalian Socialist Party (PSDI)
|align="left"|21.0%19.5%
|align="left"|
|-
|align="left"|19
|align="left"|Milan 5
|align="left"|Mario VenanziPietro Caleffi
|align="left"|Italian Communist PartyItalian Socialist Party
|align="left"|25.7%22.1%
|align="left"|
|-
|align="left"|20
|align="left"|Milan 6
|align="left"|Arialdo Banfi
|align="left"|Italian Socialist Party
|align="left"|22.9%
|align="left"|
|-
|align="left"|21
|align="left"|Abbiategrasso
|align="left"|Luigi NoèAda Valeria Ruhl
|align="left"|Christian DemocracyItalian Communist Party
|align="left"|40.9%31.5%
|align="left"|
|-
|align="left"|22
|align="left"|Rho
|align="left"|Mario DosiGian Mario Albani
|align="left"|Christian DemocracyItalian Communist Party (Gsi)
|align="left"|39.7%33.3%
|align="left"|
|-
|align="left"|23
|align="left"|Monza
|align="left"|Vittorio Pozzar
|align="left"|Christian Democracy
|align="left"|43.2%
|align="left"|
|-
|align="left"|24
|align="left"|Vimercate
|align="left"|Giovanni MarcoraGianfranco Maris
|align="left"|Christian DemocracyItalian Communist Party
|align="left"|48.7%27.1%
|align="left"|
|-
|align="left"|25
|align="left"|Lodi
|align="left"|Camillo RipamontiGiovanni Brambilla
|align="left"|Christian DemocracyItalian Communist Party
|align="left"|43.1%35.5%
|align="left"|
|-
|align="left"|26
|align="left"|Pavia
|align="left"|Vittorio Naldini
|align="left"|Italian Communist Party (PSIUP)
|align="left"|36.3%
|align="left"|
|-
|align="left"|27
|align="left"|Voghera
|align="left"|Giorgio Piovano
|align="left"|Italian Communist Party
|align="left"|32.8%
|align="left"|Giovanni Celasco (DC) 35.2%
|-
|align="left"|28
|align="left"|Vigevano
|align="left"|Francesco Soliano
|align="left"|Italian Communist Party
|align="left"|44.3%
|align="left"|
|-
|align="left"|29
|align="left"|Sondrio
|align="left"|Athos ValsecchiEdoardo Catellani
|align="left"|Christian DemocracyItalian Socialist Party
|align="left"|53.9%23.1%
|align="left"|
|-
|align="left"|30
|align="left"|Varese
|align="left"|Pio AlessandriniPaolo Cavezzali
|align="left"|Christian DemocracyItalian Socialist Party
|align="left"|43.4%20.8%
|align="left"|
|-
|align="left"|31
|align="left"|Busto Arsizio 
|align="left"|Natale SanteroMichele Zuccalà
|align="left"|Christian DemocracyItalian Socialist Party
|align="left"|45.3%19.2%
|align="left"|
|}

Senators with a direct mandate have bold percentages. Please remember that the electoral system was, in the other cases, a form of proportional representation and not a FPTP race: so candidates winning with a simple plurality could have (and usually had) a candidate (usually a Christian democrat) with more votes in their constituency.

Substitutions
Elena Gatti for Mantua (19.4%) replaced Alessandro Morino in 1969. Reason: death.
Leonello Zenti for Mantua (35.6%) replaced Natale Santero in 1971. Reason: death.
Giovanni Celasco for Voghera (35.2%) replaced Annibale Fada in 1971. Reason: death.

Notes

Elections in Lombardy
1968 elections in Italy